Spencer Kelly is the presenter of the BBC's technology programme Click, broadcast on the BBC World News and the BBC News Channel in the United Kingdom.

Early life
Kelly, then known as Spencer Bignell, grew up in Bishopstoke, near Eastleigh in Hampshire, and attended Wyvern Secondary School in neighbouring Fair Oak, then Barton Peveril College in Eastleigh. He obtained a double first in Computer Science from Churchill College, Cambridge.

Career
It was as a student that Kelly first became involved in broadcasting, initially at Radio Glen at Southampton University, and he went on to run Cambridge University Radio. After graduating, he got a job as a traffic presenter - going by the name of "Commander Kelly in the Flying Eye" on the local radio station for Portsmouth and Southampton, Ocean FM. He later became the station's breakfast show host, a position he held for six years.

He joined the BBC in January 2003 as one of five iPresenters (interactive presenters). The team pioneered new forms of interactive broadcasting, using the web, digital television and digital radio. This included interactive LiveChats, which were live interviews with celebrities, streamed across the web, in which the audience had the opportunity to ask live questions to the guests. He also began reporting for BBC World's Click Online show for two and a half years and appeared on Five's The Gadget Show. He became the presenter of the renamed Click series in January 2006, taking over from Stephen Cole.

He was awarded an Honorary Doctorate of Technology by Coventry University. He is represented by the agency Curtis Brown.

References

External links 
 Spencer Kelly
 

1973 births
Living people
BBC newsreaders and journalists
BBC World News
British reporters and correspondents
English male journalists
English television presenters
Alumni of Churchill College, Cambridge
People from Bishopstoke